Jung In-sun (born April 25, 1991) is a South Korean actress.

Filmography

Film

Television series

Web series

Television show

Music video appearance

Ambassadorship 
 Public Relations Ambassador for the 41st International Contemporary Dance Festival (2022)

Awards and nominations

References

External links
 
 
 
 

1991 births
Living people
South Korean television actresses
South Korean film actresses
South Korean child actresses
South Korean web series actresses
20th-century South Korean actresses
21st-century South Korean actresses
People from Goyang
Sejong University alumni